Annecy – Haute-Savoie – Mont Blanc Airport or Aéroport Annecy Haute-Savoie Mont Blanc , also known as Aéroport d'Annecy - Meythet, is an airport located 3.5 km northwest of Annecy, between Meythet and Metz-Tessy, all communes of the Haute-Savoie département in the Rhône-Alpes région of France.

Airlines and destinations 
No destinations served at present.

Statistics

References

External links 
 Aéroport Annecy Haute-Savoie Mont Blanc (official site) 
 Aéroport d'Annecy - Haute Savoie (Union des Aéroports Français) 
 
 

Airports in Auvergne-Rhône-Alpes